The Mystery of Matter: Search for the Elements is a 2014 American documentary miniseries, which premiered nationwide on August 19, 2015. The PBS documentary, in three-episodes of one hour each, was directed by Stephen Lyons and Muffie Meyer.

The series, which took ten years to make, describes the search for the basic chemical elements that form matter by focusing on the lives and times of seven scientific visionaries. Hosted by actor Michael Emerson, the series depicts the creative process of the scientists, with actors describing the process of discovery in the scientists' own words and reenacting their major discoveries using replicas of their original laboratory equipment.

Episodes

Participants
The documentary is narrated by Michael Emerson and includes the following participants (alphabetized by last name):

 Matthew Amendt (actor)
 Michael Aronov (actor)
 Hugo Becker (actor)
 Ava Deluca-Verley (actress)
 Michael Emerson (narrator)
 Russell Egdell (chemist)
 Nick Gehlfuss (actor)
 John L. Heilbron (biographer)
 Roald Hoffmann (chemist)
 David Kaiser (physicist/historian)
 Paul Lyons (actor)
 Anthony Marble (actor)
 Seymour Mauskopf (historian)
 Patrick Page (actor)
 Gregory Petsko (chemist)
 Lawrence M. Principe (chemist/historian)
 Sebastian Roché (actor)
 Alan Rocke (historian)
 Juliet Rylance (actress)
 Eric Scerri (chemist)
 Neil Todd (Manchester University)

Gallery

The seven featured scientists

Cast and advisors

Reviews and criticism
According to Carman Drahl of Forbes magazine, "Chemists will quickly recognize the life stories of giants in their field. This show wasn’t designed just for chemists, however. The target audience includes teachers, students, and curious TV viewers." The series, based on a National Science Foundation project description, tells "a 'detective story' of chemistry, stretching from the ancient alchemists to today's efforts to find stable new forms of matter". Mark Dawidziak, of the Cleveland Plain Dealer, quotes the historical advisor, Alan Rocke: "[The series] portrays science as [a] very human process. People see it is a very mechanical process. A great humanity is revealed by these stories, but also the unfolding process of how science actually comes to these understandings of nature." Erica K. Jacobsen, of the Chemical Education Division of the American Chemical Society, found the series to be "an excellent tool for bringing students a different view of the periodic table and those involved in its history".

See also 

 Atom
 Chemical element
 Electron
 History of chemistry
 History of the periodic table
 Neutron
 Proton
 Search for the Super Battery (2017 PBS film)

References

External links
 The Mystery of Matter at the PBS WebSite/1.
 The Mystery of Matter (videos) at the PBS WebSite/2.
 
 
 
 The Mystery of Matter at Amazon.com
 
 The Mystery of Matter – video search on YouTube
 The Mystery of Matter – video search on Dailymotion

2010s American television miniseries
2010s American documentary television series
History of chemistry
Periodic table in popular culture
Science docudramas